Veracevine is an alkaloid that occurs in the seeds of Schoenocaulon officinale.  It is used as an insecticide in veterinary medicine.

See also 
 Veratridine, a related alkaloid

References 

Isoquinoline alkaloids
Insecticides